Marradi is an Italian municipality in the Metropolitan City of Florence.

Marradi may also refer to:

 Giovanni Marradi (1852–1922), Italian poet 
 Giovanni Marradi (musician) (born 1952), Italian composer, pianist, arranger and television presenter

See also
 Maradi (disambiguation)